The 2016 IIHF Challenge Cup of Asia is the 9th IIHF Challenge Cup of Asia, an annual international ice hockey tournament held by the International Ice Hockey Federation (IIHF). It took place between 12 and 18 March 2016 in Abu Dhabi, United Arab Emirates.

Top Division

Preliminary round

Awards and statistics

Awards
Media All-Stars:
 MVP:  To Weng
 Goalkeeper:  Ahmed Ald Dhaheri
 Defenceman:  Yen-Lin Shen
 Forward:  Hung-Ju Lin

Scoring Leaders

GP = Games played; G = Goals; A = Assists; Pts = Points; +/− = Plus/minus; PIM = Penalties in minutes 

 Source: IIHF.com

Goaltending leaders
Only the top five goaltenders, based on save percentage, who have played at least 40% of their team's minutes, are included in this list.

TOI = Time on ice (minutes:seconds); SA = Shots against; GA = Goals against; GAA = Goals against average; Sv% = Save percentage; SO = Shutouts

Source: IIHF.com

Division I

The Division I competition will played between 9 and 14 April 2016 in Bishkek, Kyrgyzstan.

Preliminary round

References

External links
International Ice Hockey Federation
Challenge Cup of Asia - IIHF

IIHF Challenge Cup of Asia
2015–16 in Asian ice hockey
IIHF Challenge Cups of Asia